South Eastern Titans Rugby League Club is an Australian rugby league football club based in Dandenong, Victoria formed in 2007. Previously known as Dandenong Knights and then the Berwick Bulldogs they conduct teams for both Juniors & Seniors teams since the renaming of the club.
In round 23 of the 2012 season, the club was historically the first ever to develop a Victorian born and bred player into the National Rugby League. That player to achieve such a milestone was Mahe Fonua who has gone on to play 50 first grade games for the Melbourne Storm and represent internationally for Tonga.

Notable Juniors 
Following are player that went on to play professional first grade rugby league.
Digby Ioane (2006- Western Force, Queensland Reds & Canterbury Crusaders)
Mahe Fonua (2012- Melbourne Storm)
Francis Tualau (2017-18 Canterbury Bulldogs)

Other Juniors
Mahe Fonua (2010-12 Melbourne Storm U20)
Justin Tavae (2010 Melbourne Storm U18)
Francis Tualau (2014-15 Melbourne Storm U20)
Kaleb Anthony

See also

Rugby league in Victoria

References

External links
 
 

Rugby league clubs in Melbourne
Rugby league teams in Victoria (Australia)
Rugby clubs established in 2007
2007 establishments in Australia
Dandenong, Victoria
Sport in the City of Greater Dandenong